Wilhermsdorf station is a railway station in the municipality of Wilhermsdorf, located in the district of Fürth in Middle Franconia, Germany.

References

Railway stations in Bavaria
Buildings and structures in Fürth (district)